Hoang Kieu (Hoàng Ku, born in Vietnam - Triệu Phong, Quảng Trị Province) is a Vietnamese-born American billionaire who owned 37% of Shanghai RAAS Blood Products in 2013, which is traded on the Shenzhen Stock Exchange. He debuted on the 2014 Forbes Billionaires List, with a net worth of $3.8 billion.

References

1944 births
Living people
American billionaires
Vietnamese billionaires
Vietnamese emigrants to the United States
People from Quảng Trị province
Vietnamese business executives
American business executives
20th-century American businesspeople